The Georgia Southern Eagles women's basketball team is the basketball team that represents Georgia Southern University in Statesboro, Georgia, United States.  The school's team currently competes in the Sun Belt Conference and holds matches at Hanner Fieldhouse.

History
The Eagles previously played in the New South Women's Athletic Conference from 1985 to 1989, the Trans-Atlantic Athletic Conference (now known as the Atlantic Sun Conference from 1989 to 1992 and the Southern Conference from 1992 to 2014 before joining the Sun Belt Conference in 2014. Georgia Southern made it to the NCAA tournament in 1993 and 1994, losing in the First Round to Alabama 102-70 and 101–53 to North Carolina, respectively. As of the end of the 2015–16 season, the Eagles have an all-time record of 642–573.

Postseason results

NCAA Division I

AIAW Division I
The Eagles made one appearance in the AIAW National Division I basketball tournament, with a combined record of 0–1.

References

External links